The Killing is the fourth novel of the CHERUB series by Robert Muchamore. The book chronicles the adventures of the CHERUB agents investigating a small-time crook who suddenly makes it big. Muchamore named the book after the film The Killing. The novel was generally well received, but, unlike its predecessor, received no awards.

Plot 
James is dumped by his girlfriend, Kerry Chang. As James leaves Kerry's room, he beats up red-shirt Andy Lagan for laughing at him. For this, James is suspended from missions, and is also ostracized by his friends. Zara Askew takes pity on James and arranges for him to work with Dave Moss on a low-risk mission in London. The target is Leon Tarasov, a Russian-born small-time criminal who has mysteriously come into a large sum of money. When they get to their flat in south London, Dave gets a job at Tarasov's car dealership, and while James begins dating a girl named Hannah Clarke. During his first night in the area, James gets into an altercation and is subsequently arrested by police officer Michael Patel, who assaults James as he places him into the police car. Hannah tells James how her cousin, Will, fell from their apartment building more than a year earlier, and gives him Will's old computer.

Back home, James finds that Will had a CD with information about a robbery at a casino that happened shortly before his death. Conferring with their police liaison, ex-cherub Millie Kentner, the team discovers that the CD's contents also implicate Patel's wife Patricia and Patel and Kentner's ex-colleague Eric Crisp, both former employees of the casino. A few days later, Hannah reveals that after Will's death, Patel had run over to his body and touched it, supposedly to see if he was still alive. James and Dave deduce that Patel had killed Will and touched the body to cover up any forensic evidence he had left. To help find more evidence to capture Michael Patel, Kerry and Lauren join the team. Alone with Kerry, James kisses her; she reciprocates, but tells him that she is still not talking to him.

The mission team decides to provoke an altercation between Tarasov and Patel by replacing Patricia's car (purchased from Tarasov) with a cut-and-shut. In the resulting argument, Tarasov and Patel both incriminate themselves for the casino robbery and Patel's murder of Will, as well as for bribing Patel's colleague Alan Falco to cover up witness statements implicating Patel. When confronted, Falco agrees to testify against Patel and Tarasov in exchange for immunity from prosecution, and Patel and Tarasov are arrested. Returning to campus, James finally tells Kerry that he loves her, and she agrees to talk to him again.

In the epilogue, Tarasov is sentenced to 12 years in prison, while Patel is sentenced to life with a non-parole period of 18 years. Kentner, disheartened by the police corruption uncovered in the subsequent investigation, transfers to the CIB. James is welcomed back by his friends, though Kerry decides - for the time being - to not take him back as her boyfriend.

Characters

References

External links 

 

2005 British novels
CHERUB novels
English novels
Hodder & Stoughton books